Nova akropola (New Acropolis in Slovene) is the second studio album by Laibach. It was released in 1986.

Track listing
 "Vier Personen" (Four Persons) (Jani Novak) – 5:26
 "Nova akropola" (New Acropolis) (Jani Novak/Milan Fras/Dejan Knez) – 6:55
 "Krvava gruda - plodna zemlja" (Bloody Ground - Fertile Land) (Jani Novak/Milan Fras/Dejan Knez) – 4:07
 "Vojna poema" (War Poem) (Jani Novak) – 3:12
 "Ti, ki izzivaš" (Outro) (You, who are challenging) (Bernard Herrmann) – 1:20
 "Die Liebe" (Love) (Milan Fras) – 4:26
 "Država" (State) (Jani Novak) – 4:19
 "Vade Retro" (Go Back) (Dejan Knez) – 4:33
 "Panorama" (Jani Novak/Milan Fras/Dejan Knez, melody inspired by Gustav Holst Mars, the first movement of the Planets suite) – 4:52
 "Decree" (Jani Novak/Milan Fras/Dejan Knez) – 6:41

Credits
Music published by Complete Music Ltd.
Recorded and mixed at Metropolis Studio, Oasis Studio and Guerilla Studio 1985.
Produced by Jurij, Toni, Ken Thomas, Rico Conning and Laibach except "Decree" and "Panorama" produced by Laibach and D-Moniker (Duncan Macdonald).

Release details
Re-issued in 2002 as an Enhanced CD - with "Država" as video.

References

Laibach (band) albums
1985 albums
Wax Trax! Records albums